National Secondary Route 230, or just Route 230 (or ) is a National Road Route of Costa Rica, located in the Cartago province.

Description
In Cartago province the route covers Jiménez canton (Juan Viñas district), Turrialba canton (Turrialba, Santa Cruz, Santa Rosa districts), Alvarado canton (Pacayas, Cervantes, Capellades districts), Oreamuno canton (Cot, Cipreses districts).

References

Highways in Costa Rica